Negedu is a surname. Notable people with the surname include:

Juliana Negedu (born 1979), Nigerian basketball player
Charles Negedu (born 1989), Nigerian footballer
 

Surnames of Nigerian origin